Pietro Persio (died 1578) was a Roman Catholic prelate who served as Bishop of Nusco (1573–1578).

Biography
On 23 Jan 1573, Pietro Persio was appointed by Pope Gregory XIII as Bishop of Nusco.
He served as Bishop of Nusco until his death in 1578.

References

External links and additional sources
 (for Chronology of Bishops) 
 (for Chronology of Bishops) 

16th-century Italian Roman Catholic bishops
1578 deaths
Bishops appointed by Pope Gregory XIII